Ossman is a surname. Notable people with the surname include:

David Ossman (born 1936), American writer and comedian
Vess Ossman (1868–1923), American banjoist

See also
Osman (name)